Twenty is a hamlet in the South Kesteven district of Lincolnshire, England. Agriculture is the major industry.

Location
Twenty is situated on the A151 road, possibly originally a Roman road or Norman causeway, a road today notable for the very deep drainage dyke that runs alongside it. Nearby are Guthram Gowt and West Pinchbeck. Immediately to the south is the River Glen.

No separate population statistic is available for Twenty. The best available report lumps together Dyke, Twenty, South Fen and Spalding Road outside Bourne, with a total of 495, with Dyke being the largest.

Modern drainage

The area falls within the drainage area of the Black Sluice Internal Drainage Board. They maintain a small electric pumping station to the west of the crossroads, called Twenty Pumping Station

See also
 List of places with numeric names

References

 Wheeler, W.H. A History of the Fens of South Lincolnshire, 2nd edn. Boston & London. 1896. Facsimile edn Paul Watkins. Stamford. 1990.  .
 Ordnance Survey. 1:25 000 First Series. Sheet TF12 (Dowsby). 1955.
 Croft, E. Lincolnshire Railway Stations. Reflections of a Bygone Age. Nottingham. 1993.  . (a photo of Twenty Station).
 Dugdale, W. Imbanking and Draining. 1662. (Map of the Lindsey Level.)
 Bevis, T. Hereward and De Gestis Herwardi Saxonis Westrydale Press. March. 1981. (direct translation of the Peterborough monk's work).
 Sugar Beet: see Discovery and ulterior links.
 Sugar Beet: slightly fuller history in French: see Histoire and ulterior links (External links).

External links

 District Council page on Bourne
 
 Lincolnshire Wildlife Trust

Hamlets in Lincolnshire
South Kesteven District